Żakowola Poprzeczna  is a village in the administrative district of Gmina Kąkolewnica Wschodnia, within Radzyń Podlaski County, Lublin Voivodeship, in eastern Poland.

See also
Lublin Land cuisine

References

Villages in Radzyń Podlaski County